The table below shows all railroad lines that have served New York City and what terminal they used. A red background indicates that the railroad owned a part or full share of the terminal.

See also

North River (Hudson River)
Bergen Hill
Timeline of Jersey City area railroads
List of ferries across the Hudson River in New York City

References
PRR Chronology
New York and Vicinity Railroad Map from 1860 (BrooklynRail.net)

 
Transportation in Hudson County, New Jersey